1994 JEF United Ichihara season

Review and events

League results summary

League results by round

Competitions

Domestic results

J.League

Suntory series

NICOS series

Emperor's Cup

J.League Cup

Player statistics

 † player(s) joined the team after the opening of this season.

Transfers

In:

Out:

Transfers during the season

In
Shū Yashiro (from Meiji University)
Nenad Maslovar (from Red Star on July)

Out
Pierre Littbarski (on November)

Awards
J.League Top Scorer: Ordenewitz

Notes

References

Other pages
 J. League official site
 JEF United Ichihara Chiba official web site

JEF United Ichihara
JEF United Chiba seasons